St. Peter's Cemetery (formerly the French Cemetery or  Le Cimietière de la Congrégation Canadienne) is a cemetery in Lewiston, Maine. It is operated by the Roman Catholic Diocese of Portland. A number of burials occurred in the cemetery prior to its official inception in 1876 and over 45,000 burials have taken place since.

Notable interments
 Lew Cody (1884–1934), Actor

References

Cemeteries in Androscoggin County, Maine
Buildings and structures in Lewiston, Maine
1876 establishments in Maine
Roman Catholic cemeteries in the United States